Structural Integrity is a scientific book series covering the research field and technical view of the structural integrity and failure area. The series was established in 2017 and is published by Springer Science+Business Media. The editors-in-chief are José A.F.O. Correia and Abílio De Jesus (University of Porto). It is abstracted and indexed in Scopus.

Structural Integrity Awards
Every year, the awards committee, composed of the editors and the editorial advisory board, selects the best contribution to the series for the "Structural Integrity-Series Award". In addition, the "Structural Integrity Award of Merit" honors a person with outstanding contributions in the structural integrity and failure area.

 the winners of the "Structural Integrity Award of Merit" have been:
2018: Francesco Iacoviello (University of Cassino and Southern Lazio)
2019: Krishnaswamy Ravi-Chandar (University of Texas at Austin)
2020: Filippo Berto (Norwegian University of Science and Technology)

References

External links

English-language journals
Engineering journals
Series of books
Springer Science+Business Media academic journals
Publications established in 2017